An impossibility defense is a criminal defense occasionally used when a defendant is accused of a  criminal attempt that failed only because the crime was factually or legally impossible to commit. Factual impossibility is rarely  an adequate defense at common law. This is not to be confused with a 'mistake of fact' defence, which may be a defence to a specific intent crime like larceny.

Factual impossibility
An impossibility occurs when, at the time of the attempt, the  facts make  the intended crime impossible to commit although the defendant is unaware of this when the attempt is made. In People v. Lee Kong, 95 Cal. 666, 30 P. 800 (1892), the defendant was found guilty for attempted murder for shooting at a hole in the roof, believing his victim to be there, and indeed, where his victim had been only moments before but was not at the time of the shooting. Another case involving the defense of factual impossibility is Commonwealth v. Johnson, in which a psychic healer was charged and convicted of fraud, despite the fact that a fictitious name was used to catch him. In United States v. Thomas the court held that men who believed they were raping a drunken, unconscious woman were guilty of attempted rape, even though the woman was actually dead at the time sexual intercourse took place.

Legal impossibility
An act that is considered legally impossible to commit is traditionally considered a valid defence for a person who was being prosecuted for a criminal attempt. An attempt is considered to be a legal impossibility when the defendant has completed all of his intended acts, but his acts fail to fulfil all the required in elements in a common law or statutory crime. The underlying rationale is that attempting to do what is not a crime is not attempting to commit a crime. One example of legal impossibility is a person who, thinking that Country 1 has banned the importation of lace from Country 2, attempts to smuggle some "banned" lace into Country 1.  The actor believed that her act was a crime, and even fully intended to commit a crime. However, Country 1 does not, in fact, ban lace from Country 2.  The traditional approach to understanding the legal impossibility defence is that the mistake (about the content of the law of Country 1) insulates the actor from a conviction for the crime of attempted smuggling.  The legal impossibility may be thought of as reflecting that the actor had not satisfied the actus reus of the crime (because they had not actually brought a banned substance into the country). To put it another way, merely trying to commit a crime is insufficient to constitute a criminal attempt; for criminal liability to attach, the actor must be attempting to engage in behaviour that is actually criminal.

Legal impossibility can be distinguished from factual impossibility, which is not generally a defence at common law. Factual impossibility involves an error as to factual reality (the state of the world) that causes the actor to fail to commit a criminal offence when, if the circumstances were as the actor believed, the offence would have been committed. Legal impossibility involves an error as to a legal reality (the state of the law).

However, it is not always easy to identify whether an actor made a legal and factual mistake.  In State v. Guffey (1953), the defendant shot a stuffed deer, thinking it was alive and was convicted for attempt to kill a protected animal out of season. In a highly debated reversal, an appellate judge threw out the conviction on the basis of legal impossibility, concluding that it is no crime to shoot a stuffed deer out of season.

See also
People v. Dlugash
DPP v Armstrong

Footnotes

Common law
Criminal defenses
Attempt